The Australian Society of Archivists is a professional organization of archivists in Australia.

The Australian Library Association had an archives section between 1951 and 1973.

Significant persons in the starting of the society include Phyllis Mander-Jones, and Robert Sharman who became the editor of the journal Archives and Manuscripts 

The inaugural meeting of the Society was held at the Australian National University in April 1975. The first biennial conference was held in 1977.

Journal 

The Society publishes a professional and scholarly journal called Archives and Manuscripts (three issues per year, currently published through Taylor & Francis).
Editors included:
 Mander-Jones, Phyllis
 Horton, Alan Roy
 Gibbney, H J (Herbert James)
 Sharman, R. C. (Robert Charles)
The original title was: -

 Archives and manuscripts : the journal / of the Archives Section of the Library Association of Australia.
 Sydney : the Association, 1962-1976.

 With vol. 6, no. 6 (February 1976) it became the journal of the Australian Society of Archivists.

Conferences 
Annual conferences of the society include the Loris Williams Memorial Lecture, honouring Loris Williams, and the Mander Jones Awards.

Notable members
Anne-Marie Schwirtlich AM - former Director-General of the National Library of Australia

Publications

External links 
 
 Archives and Manuscripts journal homepage

References

 
1975 establishments in Australia
Non-profit organisations based in Australia
Archivist associations